The Life with God Bible is a study Bible published by Harper in 2005, and utilizes the New Revised Standard Version (NRSV). It was formerly published under the name Renovaré Spiritual Formation Bible, but has been republished under the Life with God title.

The Deuterocanonical Editions
There are two editions of the Bible; those with the Deuterocanonical books, and those without them. The reasoning for adding the books (according to former Renovaré president, Richard Foster) is summarized as, "1. The Deuterocanonical books were part of the ancient Greek Bible, the Septuagint, which was in circulation during the time of Christ. It was the Bible of the early Church. This Bible shaped the conscious awareness of God for the first Christians. 2. The Deuterocanonical books help Christian readers understand the New Testament context—the context of Jesus' ministry as well as of the writers of the New Testament books. The people Jesus encountered and taught were in many ways spiritually formed by these writings.3. Most of the Church throughout most of her history has included the Deuterocanonical books as part of the Bible. The Eastern Orthodox Bible, the Greek Bible, the Slavonic Bible, the Anglican Bible and the Roman Catholic Bible all currently include the Deuterocanonical books. Plus, while not viewing them as Scripture, early Protestant Bibles—Luther's translation, the Great Bible of 1539, the Geneva Bible of 1560 (supported by John Calvin and John Knox), the Bishops' Bible of 1568, and the King James Bible of 1611—included the Deuterocanonical books, or "Apocrypha," as something of an appendix. 4. Throughout the ages, many questions have persisted about the value of the Deuterocanonical books. Even those groups in our time who include and use the Deuterocanonicals do not give them the same authority as the primary canon. And we, the General Editors of The Life with God Bible, would not want to accord these books the same authority as revealed Scripture. Still, their role in bridging the gap between Malachi and Matthew is unquestioned and they provide marvelous insight into the way in which the first Christians understood their relationship to God. 5. The Deuterocanonical books do not affect any central doctrine of the Christian faith, but they do contain many helpful insights for spiritual formation. For this reason alone they are worth reading and can function for us today in much the same way that good sermons and devotional writings do. Of them, Luther wrote, "Apocrypha—that is, books which are not regarded as equal to the holy Scriptures, and yet are profitable and good to read."" The Deuterocanonical Books that appear in the Bible are the same as those translated by the NRSV.  Foster, however, is incorrect in stating that the 'Anglican Bible' includes the Deuterocanonical books.  (Anglican doctrine on the matter is exactly the same as the attitude he attributes to Luther, above.)

Some of the Editors
Editors and contributors include Walter Brueggemann, Marva Dawn, Richard Foster, James Earl Massey, Thomas Oden, Eugene Peterson, Andrew Purves, Dallas Willard, William Willimon, and Ben Witherington III.

References

2005 books
Study Bibles
2005 in Christianity